Endsleigh Cottage (now "Endsleigh House") is a country house near Milton Abbot, about 6 miles NW of Tavistock, Devon in England. It is a Grade I listed building. The gardens are Grade I listed in the National Register of Historic Parks and Gardens. The house was built in the early 19th century for the Duke of Bedford. Today, it is a hotel.

History
The house was built between  1810 and 1816  by  John Russell, 6th Duke of Bedford, as a private family residence, to the designs of Sir Jeffry Wyatville, in the style of the  picturesque movement, and is a grand form of the cottage orné. It has been a Grade I Listed Building since 21 March 1967. It was situated within the manor of Milton Abbot, a former manor belonging to Tavistock Abbey, which had been granted with its lands  by King Henry VIII to his ancestor John Russell, 1st Baron Russell (created in 1550 1st Earl of Bedford).  It is situated on the east bank of the River Tamar, over which it commands superb views to the south and west. Pevsner stated that "the situation of Endsleigh can hardly be matched". It  was usefully positioned as a residence whilst the Duke, normally residing at Woburn Abbey in Bedfordshire,  was inspecting his extensive Bedford estates in Devon and Cornwall. Before the Civil War, when in Devon the Earl of Bedford resided occasionally at Bedford House in Exeter, built by the family on the site of the Blackfriars Monastery, which had been granted, along with many other lands, to the first Earl of Bedford after the Dissolution of the Monasteries. Endsleigh was also used by the family as a summer holiday home and salmon-fishing lodge. The London streets Endsleigh Street, Endsleigh Gardens and Endsleigh Place, leading off Tavistock Square, all built by a former Duke on the  extensive Bedford Estate are named after the family's Devon property.

Description

Hussey described it as "the outstanding and probably most nearly perfect surviving instance of a romantic cottage orné, devised for an aristocratic owner under the influence of the taste for the picturesque". The site was chosen by the Duchess,  as a plaque in the stables records. It consists of a main range with two swept-back wings on either side. The roofline displays several chimney stacks in the Elizabethan style and dormer windows.

Grounds
The landscaping was designed by Humphry Repton and the grounds originally comprised a plantation of 300 acres, including a thickly wooded slope going down to the river,  and gardens of 20 acres. The buildings in the grounds include the Shell Grotto, a polygonal summer-house and the Swiss Cottage, restored by the Landmark Trust with a thatched roof. Also, the Dairy Dell, by Repton, Pond Cottages by a pool and the octagonal Dairy surrounded by a loggia, and the Holy Well, part of which is an ancient structure formerly situated at Leigh Barton, and used as the baptismal font of the hunting seat of the Abbots of Tavistock Abbey. The following structures as well as the main house are Grade I listed: Rockery and Grotto, Stables, Salmon Larder and Ice House, Shell House and Grotto.

Hastings Russell, 12th Duke of Bedford died in 1953, aged 64, as a result of a gunshot wound in the grounds of Endsleigh. The coroner recorded his death as accidentally inflicted, but his elder son suggested it may have been deliberately self-inflicted.

Today
In 2004 Endsleigh was owned by a fishing syndicate. Since 2005 it has been a hotel, which retains  of the grounds. Hotel Endsleigh is owned by Olga Polizzi and managed by her daughter, Alex Polizzi, known as the host of Channel 5's The Hotel Inspector since 2008.

Sources

Further reading
Bedford Estate Papers in the D.R.O., Devon Letters L , containing full documentation of the building of the house including correspondence from Wyatville and Repton and monthly progress reports and accounts.

References

External links

Listed Buildings text
Hotel Endsleigh website

Country houses in Devon
Grade I listed buildings in Devon
Grade I listed parks and gardens in Devon
Cottage orné
Shell grottoes
Grade I listed houses
Gardens by Humphry Repton
Houses completed in 1816
Jeffry Wyatville buildings